Joker's Wild is a world champion barbershop quartet formed in 1990 by Dave Kindinger and Mark Green from Columbus, Ohio, and Steve Legters and Stephen Iannacchione from Pittsburgh, Pennsylvania. Coached by Lance Heilmann, after winning the Johnny Appleseed District of the SPEBSQSA competition that fall, they went on to the SPEBSQSA's International contests, earning 10th place, 5th, 2nd, and finally the International  Championship in Pittsburgh in 1994.

Jon Clunies replaced Mark Green as the lead singer in 1996.

They have toured widely, performing all over the world before they went on hiatus in June 2001.

Discography
 Right From The Start (Cassette, CD; 1993)
 Chasing a Dream (Cassette, CD; 1996)
 More of the Different (CD; 2000)
Also appear on
 The Pittsburghers (Cassette, CD; 1998)
 Seems Like Old Times (CD; 1994)

External links
 Official website 
 Naked Voice Records
 AIC entry

Professional a cappella groups
Barbershop quartets
Barbershop Harmony Society